The Roxbury murders also known as “The Stride Rite Murders” (because the first two victims were discovered there dismembered in plastic trash bags) occurred between January and May 1979 when eleven Black women and one White woman were murdered within several miles of one another in the Roxbury neighborhood on the south side of Boston, Massachusetts. This was not suspected to be the work of one serial killer, as at least four different men were charged on account of these murders. The Boston Globe was one of the only media outlets to cover the killings. Those most vocal about these incidents, however, were Black feminist groups, such as the Combahee River Collective, who drew connections between the violent deaths and the multiple systematically marginalized identities of the Black, female victims.

Roxbury social climate 
During the 1970s, the Boston area endured severe racial tensions and a lethal social climate. The Roxbury neighborhood and surrounding neighborhoods, where the African-American victims were found, were in the middle of social movements that started with the desegregation of public schools. In 1974, this desegregation led to numerous of events such a riots, protests, and violent actions that occurred on both sides and led to a number of hospitalizations and deaths. Initially, the neighborhoods surrounding Roxbury belonged to certain racial groups such as Irish-Americans, Italian-Americans, and African-Americans. As Judge Garrity ordered that the school and buses be desegregated, people from different backgrounds were forced to intermingle and co-habitat. With raised tensions, there were many people that suffered various attacks. Examples include, but are not limited to, the stabbing of an African-American attorney, the public beating and death of a white male, a group of African-American high school students being trapped in the school for hours by an angry mob, and the brutal attack on an African-American football player.

The victims 
Christine (Chris) Ricketts, 15 was found on the sidewalk on East Lenox Street in Roxbury on January 29, 1979 with Andrea Foye.

Andrea Foye, 17 was found strangled on the sidewalk on East Lenox Street in Roxbury on January 29, 1979.
 Dennis Jamal Porter arrested in connection with these two killings
 Foye and Ricketts are the first two victims. Both were found in trash bags with a blanket.
Gwendolyn Yvette Stinson, 15, was found strangled in a yard near her Park Street home in Dorchester on Tuesday January, 30. Her neighbor, 40-year-old James Brown, was arrested for the murder.

Caren Prater, 25, was found dead on February 2 near Boston Parks Department office in Franklin Park. She was an unemployed mother of a two-year-old girl. The day of her death, she was heading to her 75-year-old grandfather's, Charles Prater, house who she often took shopping. Prater was beaten and stabbed to death then left behind a wooden area near a hospital. She was the fourth victim. Kenneth Spann was arrested in relation to her death.

Daryal Ann Hargett, 29, was found strangled and bound in her apartment in Wellington on Wednesday, February 21. She was a choir singer and Social Worker.

Desiree Denise Etheridge, 17, was found beaten and burned to death on Fellow Street in Dorchester on Wednesday, March 14. Her skull and jaw were shattered. She was a part-time student who lived on the same street as Stinson. Her body was found 100 yards away from a school where the bodies of Rickett and Foye were discovered.

Darlene Rogers, 22, was stabbed multiple times and was found naked from the waist down in Washington Park on April 14.

Lois Hood Nesbitt, 31, was found dead in bed tied up and strangled by a radio cord on April 28. (“Eighth Black Woman is Slain”- Boston Globe) Her murderer's name was Richard Strother, 31. Despite sharing the same address, it is unclear whether they lived in the same building together or as neighbors.

Valyric Holliday, 19, was conscious when police arrived to her apartment on a Friday night. She told police she was stabbed by an 18-year-old man, Eugene B. Conway, who lived in the Dorchester residence with her. Conway was arrested that night and pleaded innocent. Valyric died Saturday morning.

Sandra Boulware, 30, 10th woman murdered. Her naked body was found charred in a burning grass lot near a YMCA at 5 a.m. A year prior, she had moved from Connecticut to Boston. Her sister reported her missing after three days. Her murderer was Osbourne (Jimmy) Sheppard, 55.

Bobbie Jean Graham, 34, 12th woman murdered. Jean's autopsy states that she died from a lacerated liver caused by multiple blows to her midsection with a blunt object. Graham was found in an alley by a man driving past. A female witness said that she noticed a couple walking towards the alley, with the woman appearing to be intoxicated and unsteady to walk. The man then picked the woman up and carried her to the alley. Graham was found the next morning with blood on her body and indentations from a heel on her chest.

Some of the women who were mentioned in the local newspapers had a very brief description of their death and it was quickly brushed aside. On January 30, 1979, a brief article titled “Two Bodies Found in a Trash Can” consisting of four paragraphs, was published, but not once revealed their identities. The next day, Gwendolyn Yvette Stinson's identity was revealed in an even briefer article. Caren Prater's identity was finally revealed a few weeks later.

Responses to the attacks

Combahee River Collective 
Black community leaders held that these murders were acts of racialized violence, but Barbara Smith along with the Combahee River Collective wanted it to be recognized as both racialized and sexualized acts of violence against Black women. Following the march/memorial that Spring, Smith and the Collective wrote and distributed pamphlets entitled “Six Black Women: Why Did they die?” The pamphlets were distributed to the women within the community. The pamphlet itself focused specifically on the murders which were not being covered extensively by the police or media. The collective held that these murders were both racist and sexist, because not only were the people who were murdered Black but they were also women and that they were killed because they were Black women who were systemically undervalued  in American society.
On April 1, 1979, thousands gathered for a march memorializing the deaths of, at that time, six women who were murdered in a 2-mile radius of each other. The protest was organized by Barbara Smith's Combahee River Collective group. During the march, Sarah Small, aunt of slain woman, Daryal Ann Hargett, asked the audience a question: “Who's killing us?” The simple, yet powerful, question struck the audience for no one knew why Black women were being killed randomly, why their deaths were not garnering national attention like their white counterparts, and who were the murderers. During the march, many Black men caused a stir when they failed to realize that there was a gender component to the murders and did not address the violence against Black women. In 2012, TV One hosted television show, “Find Our Missing,” dedicated to creating exposure for missing Black women and girls in the United States whose cases have not gained as much national media coverage as their white counterparts. In an episode featured in the series, Hargett's death was covered.

The Coalition for Women's Safety 
The Coalition for Women's Safety, an organization of Bostonian women who worked to combat violence against women in response to the murders, established two courses of action. The first was to educate their community about the matter of violence against women, and the other was to examine licensing and regulations of taxi drivers, in response to a high number of assaults in taxicabs. Members of the Coalition also coordinated support groups for community members affected by the murders, workshops on firearm safety and self-defense for women, establishing a trust fund for families of the murdered women, educating workers in health services on assisting the needs of Latina victims of assault, and groups who traveled within the community to talk about issues of security.

Media coverage 
Local newspapers reported on these murders as they happened, and even kept a count, but despite activist work on the ground, most of these murders failed to make national news. One exception being Faye Polner, a white victim. Her death was widely publicized, but not necessarily tied to the other murders, an example of “Missing White Woman Syndrome” in the surrounding media.

References 

1979 in Boston
1979 murders in the United States
Murder in Massachusetts
Murdered African-American people
Roxbury, Boston
Violence against women in the United States
History of women in Massachusetts
Women in Boston